Admiral is a senior rank of the Royal Navy, which equates to the NATO rank code OF-9, outranked only by the rank of admiral of the fleet. Royal Navy officers holding the ranks of rear admiral, vice admiral and admiral of the fleet are sometimes considered generically to be admirals. The rank of admiral is currently the highest rank to which a serving officer in the Royal Navy can be promoted, admiral of the fleet being in abeyance except for honorary promotions of retired officers and members of the Royal Family.

The equivalent rank in the British Army and Royal Marines is general; and in the Royal Air Force, it is air chief marshal.

History

The first admirals (1224 to 1523)
King Henry III of England appointed the first known English Admiral Sir Richard de Lucy on 29 August 1224. De Lucy was followed by Sir Thomas Moulton in 1264, who also held the title of Keeper of the Sea and Sea Ports. Moulton was succeeded by Sir William de Leybourne, (the son of Sir Roger de Leybourne) as Admiral of the Sea of the King of England. In 1286 he was appointed Admiral of the Navy, holding the rank of admiral until 1294 and serving under King Edward I of England. As the English Navy was expanding towards the end of the thirteenth century, new appointments of admirals with specific administrative and geographic responsibilities were created. Sir John de Botetourt was appointed Admiral of the North in 1294. This position existed until 1412. Also in 1294, the king appointed Sir William de Laybourne to the dual commands of Admiral of the South, (1294–1412) and Admiral of the West, (1294–1412). The first royal commission as Admiral to a naval officer was granted in 1303 to Gervase Alard. By 1344 it was only used as a rank at sea for a captain in charge of a fleet or fleets. In 1364 the office of Admiral of the North and West was created until 1414. Beginning in 1408 these admirals' responsibilities were gradually absorbed by the office of the High Admiral of England, Ireland and Aquitaine (later Lord Admiral of England) leading to a centralized command by 1414. In 1412 the Admiral of the Narrow Seas was established briefly until 1413. It was revived on a more permanent basis from 1523, until lapsing again in 1688.

Squadron admirals of the colour from 1558 to 1603

In Elizabethan times the fleet grew large enough to be organised into squadrons. The squadron's admiral flew a red ensign, the vice admirals white, and the rear admirals blue on the aft mast of his ship. As the squadrons grew, each was eventually commanded by an admiral (with vice admirals and rear admirals commanding sections) and the official ranks became admiral of the white and so forth, however each admirals command flags were different and changed over time.

Introduction of vice and rear admirals
The Royal Navy has had vice and rear admirals regularly appointed to the post since at least the 16th century. When in command of the fleet, the admiral would be in either the lead or the middle portion of the fleet. When the admiral commanded from the middle portion of the fleet his deputy, the vice admiral, would be in the leading portion or van. Below him was another admiral at the rear of the fleet, called rear admiral.

Promotion path of flag officers from 1702 to 1864

Promotion up the ladder was in accordance with seniority in the rank of post-captain, and rank was held for life, so the only way to be promoted was for the person above on the list to die or resign. In 1747 the Admiralty restored an element of merit selection to this process by introducing the concept of yellow admirals (formally known as granting an officer the position of 'Rear-Admiral without distinction of squadron'), being captains promoted to flag rank on the understanding that they would immediately retire on half-pay. This was the navy's first attempt at superannuating older officers.

Interregnum to the present
During the Interregnum, the rank of admiral was replaced by that of general at sea. In the 18th century, the original nine ranks began to be filled by more than one man per rank, although the rank of admiral of the red was always filled by only one man and was known as Admiral of the Fleet. After the Battle of Trafalgar in 1805 the rank of admiral of the red was introduced. The number of officers holding each rank steadily increased throughout the 18th and early 19th centuries. In 1769 there were 29 admirals of various grades; by the close of the Napoleonic Wars in 1816 there were 190 admirals in service. Thereafter the number of admirals was reduced and in 1853 there were 79 admirals.

Although admirals were promoted according to strict seniority, appointments to command were made at the discretion of the Board of Admiralty. As there were invariably more admirals in service than there were postings, many admirals remained unemployed, especially in peacetime.

The organisation of the fleet into coloured squadrons was finally abandoned in 1864. The Red Ensign was allocated to the Merchant Navy, the White Ensign became the flag of the Royal Navy, and the Blue Ensign was allocated to the naval reserve and naval auxiliary vessels.

The 18th- and 19th-century Royal Navy also maintained a positional rank known as port admiral. A port admiral was typically a veteran captain who served as the shore commander of a British naval port and was in charge of supplying, refitting, and maintaining the ships docked at harbour.

The problem of promoting strictly by seniority was well illustrated by the case of Provo Wallis who served (including time being carried on the books while still a child) for 96 years. When he died in 1892 four admirals under him could immediately be promoted. By request of Queen Victoria, John Edmund Commerell became Admiral of the Fleet rather than Algernon Frederick Rous de Horsey, who as senior active admiral nearing the age limit would customarily have received the promotion; John Baird became an Admiral; James Erskine a vice-admiral; and Harry Rawson a rear-admiral. Ironically, all these younger men would die at least a decade before de Horsey. In the time before squadron distinctions were removed or age limits instituted, the death of James Hawkins-Whitshed resulted in ten men moving up to higher ranks.

In 1996, the rank of admiral of the fleet was put in abeyance in peacetime, except for members of the Royal family but was resurrected on an honorary basis in 2014 for the appointment of Lord Boyce. Admirals of the fleet continue to hold their rank on the active list for life.

Rank insignia and personal flag
The current ranks are rear admiral, vice admiral, admiral and admiral of the fleet, also known as flag ranks because admirals, known as flag officers, are entitled to fly a personal flag. An admiral of the fleet flies a Union Flag at the masthead, while an admiral flies a St George's cross (red cross on white). Vice admirals and rear admirals fly a St George's cross with one or two red discs in the hoist, respectively.

The rank of admiral itself is shown in its sleeve lace by a broad band with three narrower bands. In 2001 the number of stars on the shoulder board was increased to four, reflecting the equivalence to the OF-9 four-star ranks of other countries.

History command flags

Prior to 1864 the Royal Navy was divided into coloured squadrons which determined his career path. The command flags flown by an Admiral changed a number of times during this period, there was no Admiral of the Red rank until that post was introduced in 1805 prior to this the highest rank an admiral could attain to was Admiral of the White who then flew the Cross of St George. The next promotion step up from that was to Admiral of the Fleet.

See also

 Admiral of the Blue
 Admiral of the White
 Admiral of the Red
 British ensigns
 British and U.S. military ranks compared
 Coloured squadrons of the Royal Navy
 Comparative military ranks
 Royal Navy officer rank insignia
 List of Royal Navy admirals

References

Sources
 Archives, National The. (2017). "Trafalgar Ancestors, Glossary". nationalarchives.gov.uk. National Archives. London. England
 Bothwell, James (2004). Edward III and the English Peerage: Royal Patronage, Social Mobility, and Political Control in Fourteenth-century England. Boydell Press. .
 Houbraken, Jacobus. Thoyras, Paul de Rapin. Vertue, George. (1747). The History of England, A List of Admirals of England (1224–1745). England. Kanpton. P and J.
Perrin, W. G. (William Gordon) (1922). "IV:Flags of Command". British flags, their early history, and their development at sea; with an account of the origin of the flag as a national device. Cambridge, England: Cambridge : The University Press.

External links

 Squadronal colours factsheet from the Royal Naval museum.

Military ranks of the Royal Navy

it:Ammiraglio#Regno Unito